Rufaa is a city in the Al Jazirah state in east-central Sudan.

References

Populated places in Al Jazirah (state)